"Il diluvio universale" is a song by Italian singer Annalisa. It was written by Annalisa and Diego Calvetti, and produced by Calvetti.

It was released by Warner Music Italy on 11 February 2016 as the lead single from her fifth studio album Se avessi un cuore. The song was the Annalisa's entry for the Sanremo Music Festival 2016, where it placed eleventh in the grand final. "Il diluvio universale" peaked at number 25 on the FIMI Singles Chart.

Music video
The music video of "Il diluvio universale", directed by Gaetano Morbioli, was released onto YouTube on 11 February 2016.

Track listing

Charts

References

2016 singles
2016 songs
Annalisa songs
Sanremo Music Festival songs
Songs written by Annalisa
Songs written by Diego Calvetti